Noah's Ark is a type of amusement park walk-through attraction built between 1919 and 1936. It features a fun house in the shape of the biblical vessel found in the Genesis flood narrative. As such, most Noah's Arks featured scenes depicting animals and the biblical prophet Noah alongside traditional fun house gags.

History 
The first Noah’s Ark appeared at Venice Pier (California) in 1919. The attraction was designed and built by Leroy Ramond who sold the manufacturing rights to William Dentzel the following year.

Noah's Ark today 
There is only one remaining Noah's Ark in operation at Kennywood Park near Pittsburgh, Pennsylvania. Although there is a Noah's Ark at Blackpool Pleasure Beach in Blackpool, England, it has not been operational since 2008.

Notable installations

References 

Amusement park attractions